Brittany was a  passenger ferry built in 1910 for the London, Brighton and South Coast Railway. In 1912 she was sold to the London and South Western Railway, passing to the Southern Railway on 1 January 1923. She was renamed Aldershot in 1933. In 1937 she was sold to an Italian owner and renamed Hercules.

Description
The ship was built by Earle's, Kingston upon Hull. She was yard number 572 and was launched on 9 July 1910 with completion in August 1910. She had a GRT of 632 and a NRT of 256. She was powered by a triple expansion steam engine which had cylinders of 13½ inches (34 cm),  and  bore by  stroke.

History
Brittany was built for the London, Brighton and South Coast Railway. She was used on their Newhaven - Caen route. In 1912, Brittany was sold to the London and South Western Railway. Her port of registry was Southampton. She passed into the ownership of the Southern Railway on 1 January 1923. In 1933, Brittany was renamed Aldershot when the new  entered service with the Southern Railway.

In 1936, Aldershot was sold to D Tripcovich & Compagnie, Italy and renamed Hercules. She was converted to a salvage vessel and was operated under the management of Società Anonima di Navigazione Rimorchi e Salvataggi. Her port of registry was Trieste.

Official Number and code letters
Official Numbers were a forerunner to IMO Numbers. Brittany and Aldershot had the United Kingdom Official Number 105657 and used the Code Letters HRNC. Hercules had the Italian Official Number 404 and used the Code Letters IOMU.

References

External links

1910 ships
Ships of the London, Brighton and South Coast Railway
Ships of the London and South Western Railway
Steamships of the United Kingdom
World War I merchant ships of the United Kingdom
Merchant ships of the United Kingdom
Ships of the Southern Railway (UK)
Steamships of Italy
World War II merchant ships of Italy
Ships sunk by British submarines
Maritime incidents in November 1941
World War II shipwrecks in the Mediterranean Sea